The Black Watch is a 1929 American Pre-Code adventure epic film directed by John Ford and starring Victor McLaglen, Myrna Loy, and David Torrence. Written by James Kevin McGuinness based on the 1916 novel King of the Khyber Rifles by Talbot Mundy, the film is about a captain in the British Army's Black Watch regiment assigned to a secret mission in India just as his company is called to France at the outbreak of war. His covert assignment results in his being considered a coward by his fellows, a suspicion confirmed when he becomes involved in a drunken brawl in India that results in the apparent death of another officer. The film features an uncredited 21-year-old John Wayne working as an extra; he also worked in the arts and costume department for the film. This was director John Ford's first sound film.

Cast
 Victor McLaglen as Capt. Donald Gordon King
 Myrna Loy as Yasmani
 David Torrence as Field Marshal
 David Rollins as Lt. Malcolm King
 Cyril Chadwick as  Maj. Twynes
 Lumsden Hare as Colonel of the Black Watch
 Roy D'Arcy as  Rewa Ghunga
 David Percy as Soloist, Black Watch Officer
 Mitchell Lewis as  Mohammed Khan
 Claude King as General in India
 Walter Long as Harrim Bey
 Francis Ford as Maj. MacGregor
 Frederick Sullivan as General's Aide
 Richard Travers as Adjutant
 Pat Somerset as O'Connor, Black Watch Officer
 Joseph Diskay as Muezzin
 Joyzelle Joyner as Dancer
 Gregory Gaye as a 42nd Highlander (uncredited)
 Mary Gordon as Sandy's Wife (uncredited)
 Bob Kortman as a 42nd Highlander (uncredited)
 Tom London as a 42nd Highlander (uncredited)
 Jack Pennick as a 42nd Highlander (uncredited)
 Randolph Scott as a 42nd Highlander (uncredited)
 Phillips Smalley as the Doctor (uncredited)
 Lupita Tovar in a Bit Part (uncredited)
 John Wayne as a 42nd Highlander (uncredited)

See also
 List of American films of 1929

References

External links
 
 
 

American war films
American black-and-white films
1929 films
1920s adventure drama films
Films set in India
Films set in the British Raj
Films set in the 1910s
Films directed by John Ford
Fox Film films
Films based on British novels
American adventure drama films
1929 drama films
1920s English-language films
1920s American films